Forever After is the second studio album from Christian musician and singer V. Rose. The album released on May 20, 2014 by Clear Sight Music, and it was produced by Lamontt Blackshire. The album currently has received three positive reviews, and it charted on two Billboard charts.

Background
This album is the successor to V. Rose's eponymously-titled debut studio album that came out in 2011. Forever After was released by Clear Sight Music on May 20, 2014. It was produced by Lamontt Blackshire.

Music and lyrics
The music on Forever After is described as CCM, EDM, electropop, contemporary R&B, and hip hop. The music contains a lyrical focus on "waiting for that one day when there will be no more pain, sadness, or tears", with the songstress taking a "lyrically encouraging direction."

Critical reception

At Jesus Freak Hideout, Kevin Hoskins rated the album four stars out of five, remarking how "V. Rose is a rather unique pop vocalist and this album carries the weight to be played at house parties with the focus being entirely centered on Christ." However, Hoskins criticizing the sections where she "trades in vocal quality for volume, detracting from her clear talent." Caitlin Elizabeth Lassiter of New Release Tuesday rated the album four stars out of five, indicating how "Forever After boasts some impressive collaborations, pairing up the vocal techniques of V. Rose with the rap stylings of artists like Flame, Shonlock, and da T.R.U.T.H." At Wade-O Radio, Branden Murphy gave a positive review, highlighting the release as "a top quality project with great production, uplifting messages, and a Christ honoring direction." In a two star review by CCM Magazine, Grace S. Aspinwall cautioning, "With its smart, though not fantastic, vocals and arrangements, this is definitely worth a listen." Tony Cummings, rating the album a five out of ten from Cross Rhythms, writes, "But in truth 'Forever After' falls between the pop and hip-hop fields and won't satisfy many followers of either."

Commercial performance
For the Billboard charting week of June 7, 2014, Forever After charted as the No. 28 most sold album in the Christian Albums market, and it was the No. 16 most sold album in the breaking-and-entry market via the Heatseekers Albums.

Track listing

Chart performance

References

2014 albums
V. Rose albums